Kostas Triantafyllou (born 2 April 1991) is a retired Greek football midfielder.

References

1991 births
Living people
Greek footballers
Panserraikos F.C. players
Panthrakikos F.C. players
Apollon Paralimnio F.C. players
Super League Greece players
Association football midfielders
Greece under-21 international footballers
Footballers from Ptolemaida